John Bell (14 March 1873 – 1934) was a Scottish professional footballer who played as a winger.

References

1873 births
1934 deaths
Scottish footballers
Association football wingers
Renton F.C. players
Wolverhampton Wanderers F.C. players
Grimsby Town F.C. players
Swindon Town F.C. players
Bedminster F.C. players
Chatham Town F.C. players
English Football League players
Date of death missing